Alberta Vaughn (June 27, 1904 – April 26, 1992) was an American actress in silent motion pictures and early Western sound films. She appeared in some 130 motion pictures.

Early years
Born in Ashland, Kentucky, Vaughn was the sister of actress Adamae Vaughn.

Career
Vaughn was a selected as a WAMPAS Baby Star along with Clara Bow and Dorothy Mackaill in 1924. Her movie career began in 1921 and continued until 1935. She often co-starred with actor Al Cook in comedies. She made Randy Rides Alone (1934) with John Wayne. She was a member of the cast of Intermission, a play by Irving Kaye Davis, in September 1932. The production opened in San Francisco and co-starred Madge Bellamy and Judith Voselli. Vaughn made her last onscreen appearance in the 1935 film The Live Wire opposite Richard Talmadge.

 She retired from acting in 1935 at age 31.

Personal life and death

Engagements and marriages
In 1926, Vaughn became engaged to actor and leading man Grant Withers. After announcing their engagement in October 1926, Vaughn traveled to New York to film some talking sequences for a movie she was filming in Hollywood. Withers broke off the engagement after he discovered Vaughn went out with friends to nightclubs in New York. Immediately after the wedding was called off, Vaughn returned to Hollywood as the fiancée of noted attorney (later agent and producer), Charles K. Feldman.

Vaughn announced her engagement to William Laitt, a "wealthy young steel man", on August 26, 1928.

On April 8, 1934, Vaughn wed assistant casting director Joseph Egil of Paramount Pictures. (Other sources give the last name as Egli.) They were married in Yuma, Arizona. The couple was divorced on August 11, 1943.

In 1948 she married roofing contractor John R. Thompson. (The trade publication Billboard recorded his name as John R. Thomas, reporting in its July 10, 1948, issue that Thomas and she were married June 23 in Los Angeles.)

Legal problems
Already in trouble for drunk driving, Vaughn received a six-month jail sentence on May 13, 1946, for violating probation. Judge William R. McKay in Los Angeles revoked her probation and handed down the sentence after he did not accept her explanation that some sailors who rode in her car left a half-full bottle of whiskey in the vehicle.

Another probation revocation and sentence occurred in 1948. She was sentenced to a year in jail for marrying John Robert (Thomas) Thompson in violation of her terms of probation for drunk driving. Those terms "required that she consult with authorities before marrying."

In March 1949, Vaughn was jailed on an intoxication violation in Pasadena. She chose incarceration instead of paying a $25 fine. Her jail term was 12 and a half days. A previous drunken charge, then pending, would have added an additional four months to her sentence. Vaughn was arrested after an argument with her husband, John R. Thompson. The incident followed her release after serving eight months of a one-year sentence on the earlier instance.

Death
Vaughn died of cancer in Studio City, California, on April 26, 1992, aged 87. She was buried in Valhalla Memorial Park Cemetery.

Selected filmography

Further reading

References
 
Fresno Bee, Thursday, June 24, 1948, Page 14.
Nebraska Night Journal, Monday, January 14, 1929, Page 1.
The New York Times, "Al Cook, Film Comedian, Dies", July 7, 1935, Page 22.
The New York Times, "Theatrical Notes", September 17, 1932, Page 18.
The New York Times, "Alberta Vaughn Wed", April 9, 1934, Page 20.
Oakland Tribune, Thursday Evening, September 16, 1926, Section B, Page 17.
Oakland Tribune, Wednesday Evening, October 12, 1927, Page 1.
St. Joseph Herald-Press, Thursday, "Former Silent Film Star Alberta Vaughn Is Jailed On Intoxication Charge", March 3, 1949, Page 3.

External links

 
 

1904 births
1992 deaths
Deaths from cancer in California
Actresses from Kentucky
American film actresses
American silent film actresses
Burials at Valhalla Memorial Park Cemetery
People from Ashland, Kentucky
20th-century American actresses
WAMPAS Baby Stars